Juliane Nguyen is an associate professor at UNC Eshelman School of Pharmacy. She received her PharmD and PhD from Philipps-Universität Marburg in Germany, completing her PhD in Thomas Kissel's group. After receiving her degrees, she completed a Post doc with Francis Szoka at University of California, San Francisco. Her research is focused on exosomes and lipid based drug delivery systems. She was awarded a National Science Foundation CAREER award in 2018 for her work as well as $1.5M from the NIH titled "RNA EXO-Codes: A novel way to reprogram pathological exosomes". Nguyen’s work has been recognized with numerous awards, including the CMBE Young Innovator Award (2019) from the Biomedical Engineering Society, the AAPS Emerging Leader Award (2019), the NYSTAR Faculty Award (2019), the National Science Foundation CAREER Award (2018), the Pioneering Pharmaceutical Sciences by Emerging Investigators Award (2018), and the University at Buffalo – Exceptional Scholar Young Investigator Award (2017).

References

External links

Year of birth missing (living people)
Living people
Place of birth missing (living people)
Nationality missing
University at Buffalo faculty
University of Marburg alumni
Clinical pharmacologists
Women pharmacologists